Michael J. Moran (born February 23, 1971) is an American state legislator serving in the Massachusetts House of Representatives. He is the House Majority Leader, having formerly served as the Assistant Majority Leader. He is also a Brighton resident and a member of the Democratic Party.

Moran was first elected to the chamber in a special election in April 2005.

See also
 2019–2020 Massachusetts legislature
 2021–2022 Massachusetts legislature

References

|-

21st-century American politicians
Democratic Party members of the Massachusetts House of Representatives
Living people
Politicians from Boston
Year of birth missing (living people)